One Nationwide Plaza is a 40-story skyscraper in Columbus, Ohio that serves as the corporate office headquarters of Nationwide Mutual Insurance Company. It is part of the complex of buildings known as Nationwide Plaza.

Nationwide outgrew its 246 North High Street Building by the 1970s and work began on a new headquarters for the company. In 1977, the  building was completed. The building is located at the corner of N. High Street and what is now Nationwide Blvd. on the northern edge of downtown Columbus, Ohio.

Design 
The building was designed by Brubaker/Brandt (the same firm that designed Rhodes State Office Tower, the tallest building in Columbus) and Harrison & Abramovitz. The façade is dark vertical steel ribs bordered by white limestone ends which follows the modernist style. Blue spotlights light the exterior at night in the same color of Nationwide's logo. In December the interior lights are set so that it reads "happy holidays" to observers of the building, with thematic messages similarly displayed during other holidays and special events such as Columbus Blue Jackets and Ohio State Buckeyes victories and accomplishments.

There was once a restaurant on the 38th floor called One Nation, which opened in November 1977. The glass elevator on the side of the building is an express elevator that was designated for customers going to the restaurant. One Nation closed in 1997 after '[failing] to come to terms with the building's owner'. The glass elevator is no longer in service.

One Nationwide Plaza was the first of several buildings known collectively as Nationwide Plaza:
 One Nationwide Plaza, completed in 1977
 280 Plaza (also known as Two Nationwide), completed in 1981
 Three Nationwide Plaza, completed in 1988
 Four Nationwide Plaza (215 N Front St), bought in 1998 
 10 W. Nationwide Blvd, completed in December 2012

Other elements at Nationwide Plaza include Dean Jeffers Park and its decorative fountains, titled Nationwide Fountain.

Gallery

References

External links
 

Skyscraper office buildings in Columbus, Ohio
Office buildings completed in 1977
Harrison & Abramovitz buildings
Buildings in downtown Columbus, Ohio
High Street (Columbus, Ohio)